Dismorphia medorilla is a butterfly in the  family Pieridae. It is found in Ecuador, Bolivia and Peru.

Subspecies
The following subspecies are recognised:
Dismorphia medorilla medorilla (Ecuador)
Dismorphia medorilla buchtieni Fassl, 1915 (Bolivia)
Dismorphia medorilla sarita Lamas, 2004 (Peru)

References

Dismorphiinae
Pieridae of South America
Lepidoptera of Ecuador
Lepidoptera of Peru
Invertebrates of Bolivia
Butterflies described in 1877
Taxa named by William Chapman Hewitson